Ardent may refer to:

 Ardent spirits, liquors obtained after repeated distillations from fermented vegetables.
 Ardent (automobile), a French automobile produced from 1900 to 1901
Ardent Computer, a graphics minicomputer manufacturing company
Ardent Leisure, an Australian operator of theme parks and other leisure venues
Ardent Productions, a film recording company founded by Prince Edward, Earl of Wessex
Ardent Records, a Memphis record label founded in 1959
Ardent Studios, a professional recording studio in Memphis, Tennessee, in the United States
, several ships of the British Royal Navy
, various United States Navy ships
Ardent (Dungeons & Dragons), a character class in the Dungeons & Dragons role-playing game
Ardent (marine salvage company), a major marine salvage company